Loyd Albert Colson (born November 4, 1947 in Wellington, Texas) is a former Major League Baseball pitcher that batted and threw right-handed. Colson pitched the last two innings for the New York Yankees in one game on September 25, 1970 against the Detroit Tigers at Yankee Stadium. In his only career game, he gave up three hits, one earned run and struck out three batters. He finished with a 0–0 record with a 4.50 ERA.   

Colton attended Gould OK High School then attended Bacone College and was drafted by the Yankees in the 28th round of the 1967 amateur draft.

External links
Baseball Reference.com page

1947 births
Living people
New York Yankees players
Syracuse Chiefs players
Kinston Eagles players
Manchester Yankees players
West Haven Yankees players
Bacone Warriors baseball players
Fort Lauderdale Yankees players
Johnson City Yankees players
Major League Baseball pitchers
Baseball players from Texas
People from Wellington, Texas